Xinxiang East railway station is a railway station on the Beijing–Guangzhou–Shenzhen–Hong Kong high-speed railway located in Xinxiang, Henan, People's Republic of China. It opened with the Beijing–Zhengzhou section of the railway on 26 December 2012. In the future, it will be a stop on the Zhengzhou–Jinan high-speed railway.

References

Railway stations in Henan
Stations on the Shijiazhuang–Wuhan High-Speed Railway
Railway stations in China opened in 2012